GV Yishun, formerly Yishun 10, is Asia's first multiplex.

Background
First opened on 28 May 1992 by Philip Yeo, the then chairman of Economic Development Board. It is operated by Golden Village, one of Singapore's leading cinema operators. As the name suggests, it has ten halls. The multiplex is located adjacent to Northpoint City, which is linked to Yishun MRT station via an underpass.

The last day of movie screenings at Yishun 10 was 11 August 2010 to undergo a three-month renovation from 12 August 2010 to upgrade the multiplex. In November 2010, the renovation had been completed and multiplex was renamed GV Yishun, which was Golden Village first "green" cinema complex.

References

Cinemas in Singapore
Shopping malls in Singapore
Yishun